"Christmas Is Coming" is a traditional nursery rhyme and Christmas song frequently sung as a round. It is listed as number 12817 in the Roud Folk Song Index.

The most famous version goes as follows:Christmas is coming, the geese are getting fat
Please put a penny in the old man's hat
If you haven't got a penny, a ha'penny will do
If you haven't got a ha'penny, then God bless you!The traditional version of this song uses the melody of the English dance tune "Country Gardens", but other melodies exist. Edith Nesbit Bland composed a popular tune for the lyrics. A few field recordings were made of traditional versions of the song, including one sung by Jack Elliot of Birtley, Durham to Reg Hall in the early 1960s, which is archived within the  British Library Sound Archive.

The Kingston Trio recorded the song as "A Round About Christmas", on their album The Last Month of the Year. A calypso sounding version was featured on the album John Denver and the Muppets: A Christmas Together and a loose, jazzy piano-based arrangement was featured in the musical score of A Charlie Brown Christmas.

The rhyme also became the basis for the song "Christmas Is a-Comin'", written by Frank Luther and performed by Bing Crosby, among others.

See also

Soul cake#Songs

References 

Bing Crosby songs
Rounds (music)
American Christmas songs
American nursery rhymes
Jazz standards
Songwriter unknown
Year of song unknown